The Radical Whigs were a group of British political commentators associated with the British Whig faction who were at the forefront of the Radical movement.

Seventeenth century

The radical Whigs ideology "arose from a series of political upheavals in seventeenth-century England: the English Civil War, the exclusion crisis of 1679-81, and the Glorious Revolution of 1688. Broadly speaking, this Whig theory described two sorts of threats to political freedom: a general moral decay which would invite the intrusion of evil and despotic rulers, and the encroachment of executive authority upon the legislature, the attempt that power always made to subdue the liberty protected by mixed government." This political theory was mainly based on the writings of John Milton, John Locke, James Harrington, and Algernon Sydney.

Eighteenth century

The eighteenth-century Whigs, or commonwealthmen, in particular John Trenchard, Thomas Gordon, and Benjamin Hoadly, "praised the mixed constitution of monarchy, aristocracy, and democracy, and they attributed English liberty to it; and like Locke they postulated a state of nature from which rights arose which the civil polity, created by mutual consent, guaranteed; they argued that a contract formed government and that sovereignty resided in the people."

The radical Whigs' political ideas played a significant role in the development of the American Revolution, as their republican writings were widely read by the American colonists, many of whom were convinced by their reading that they should be very watchful for any threats to their liberties. Subsequently, when the colonists were indignant about their lack of representation and taxes such as the Stamp Act, the Sugar Act and the Tea Act, the colonists broke away from the Kingdom of Great Britain to form the United States of America. "Radical Whig perceptions of politics attracted widespread support in America because they revived the traditional concerns of a Protestant culture that had always verged on Puritanism. That moral decay threatened free government could not come as a surprise to a people whose fathers had fled England to escape sin. The importance of virtue, frugality, industry, and calling was at the heart of their moral code. An overbearing executive, and the threat of corruption through idle, useless officials, or placemen, had figured prominently in their explanations of their exile in America." So "most" of the ideas the American Revolutionaries put into their political system "were a part of the great tradition of the eighteenth-century commonwealthmen."

Although the commonwealthmen had little influence on British politics in the eighteenth century, their political ideas had a long-term effect on Britain's constitutional system: constitutional monarchy, which in turn became a model for other countries, for example, Sweden, Norway, Denmark, the Netherlands, and Belgium.

References

See also

Radical parties
Whig factions
Left-wing parties in the United Kingdom
Politics of the Kingdom of Great Britain